Dušan Stević (born 17 June 1995) is a Serbian football right back who plays for Rad.

Club career

Radnički Kragujevac
He made his Jelen SuperLiga debut for Radnički Kragujevac on away match versus Čukarički on 3 May 2014. In season 2013–14, he played against Novi Pazar in fixture 29, too.

References

External links
 
 Dušan Stević Stats at utakmica.rs
 Dušan Stević at Footballdatabase

1995 births
People from Brus
Living people
Association football midfielders
Serbian footballers
FK Radnički 1923 players
FK Šumadija 1903 players
Panserraikos F.C. players
FK Rabotnički players
FK Rad players
FK Napredak Kruševac players
Maritzburg United F.C. players
Serbian First League players
Serbian SuperLiga players
Football League (Greece) players
Macedonian First Football League players
South African Premier Division players
Serbian expatriate footballers
Expatriate footballers in Greece
Serbian expatriate sportspeople in Greece
Expatriate footballers in North Macedonia
Serbian expatriate sportspeople in North Macedonia
Expatriate soccer players in South Africa
Serbian expatriate sportspeople in South Africa